The CNA C-7 was a small nine-cylinder supercharged, geared, single row radial engine designed in Italy in the early 1930s. Three light aircraft class world altitude records were set by the CNA C-7 powered Fiat AS.1 and CNA Eta.

Applications
 CNA Beta
 CNA Eta
 Fiat AS.1

Specifications

References

CNA C.VI
CNA aircraft engines